Girringun National Park is a national park in Queensland, Australia, approximately  southwest of Ingham,  north of Townsville and  northwest of Brisbane.  The park is one of the Wet Tropics World Heritage Area series of national parks, and is a gazetted World Heritage Site.

History
The park was originally named the Lumholtz National Park, after scientist Carl Sofus Lumholtz, when it was created in 1994. The Blencoe Falls Section was gazetted as part of Lumholtz National Park in 2000. The name was subsequently changed to Girringun in 2003.

Environment

This large national park consists mainly of wet sclerophyll forests, but small pockets of rainforest also exist along the eastern slopes and hilltops.
The Seaview, George and Cardwell ranges dominate the landscape, which is strewn with granite debris from a volcanic eruption 100,000 years ago. Perhaps the most well known geological feature in this park is the Wallaman Falls. At  it is the largest single-drop falls in Australia.  The park forms part of the Wooroonooran Important Bird Area, identified as such by BirdLife International because it supports populations of a range of bird species endemic to Queensland's Wet Tropics.

Access and infrastructure
Vehicle access into the forest include the Dalrymple Gap Track, or the Wallaman Falls track. However, for most of the park there is only very rudimentary or absent vehicle access. Most of the park is accessible for hikers, but due to its remoteness and rugged terrain only experienced bushwalkers should undertake extensive hikes.

See also

 Herbert River Falls
 Protected areas of Queensland

References

National parks of Far North Queensland
Protected areas established in 1994
Wet Tropics of Queensland
1994 establishments in Australia
Important Bird Areas of Queensland